Mark Collins may refer to:

Mark Collins (American football) (born 1964), American football player
Mark Collins (musician) (born 1965), English musician
Mark Collins (Gaelic footballer) (born 1990), Irish Gaelic footballer
N. Mark Collins (born 1952), British director of the Commonwealth Foundation
Marco Collins (Mark William Collins, born 1965), American radio personality